

This is a list of the National Register of Historic Places listings in southern Westchester County, New York, excluding the cities of New Rochelle and Yonkers, which have separate lists of their own.

This is intended to be a complete list of the properties and districts on the National Register of Historic Places in the southern half of Westchester County, New York, United States. The following communities comprise this region:
Town of Eastchester, including the villages of Bronxville and Tuckahoe, and the hamlet of Crestwood
Town of Greenburgh, excluding Tarrytown but including the villages of Ardsley, Dobbs Ferry, Elmsford, Hastings-on-Hudson, and Irvington, and the hamlets of Edgemont and Hartsdale
Village and town of Harrison
Town of Mamaroneck, including the villages of Larchmont and Mamaroneck
City of Mount Vernon
Town of Pelham, which is the villages of Pelham and Pelham Manor
City of Rye
Town of Rye, including the villages of Port Chester and Rye Brook
Village and town of Scarsdale
City of White Plains

Latitude and longitude coordinates are provided for many National Register properties and districts; these locations may be seen together in online maps.

Of the 239 properties and districts listed on the National Register in the county, 92, including six National Historic Landmarks (NHLs), are on this list. Two, the Bronx River Parkway and Old Croton Aqueduct, the latter an NHL, are linear listings included on both this list and the northern Westchester list.

Current listings

|}

Former listing

|}

See also
National Register of Historic Places listings in New York
National Register of Historic Places listings in Westchester County, New York
National Register of Historic Places listings in New Rochelle, New York
National Register of Historic Places listings in Yonkers, New York

References

Further reading
  

Westchester County, New York